Isaac Losee House is a historic home located at Huntington in Suffolk County, New York. It is a -story, five-bay, clapboard dwelling with a gable roof. The main entrance features a shed roof porch with square columns. It was built about 1750 and representative of the early settlement of Huntington.

It was added to the National Register of Historic Places in 1985.

References

Houses on the National Register of Historic Places in New York (state)
Houses completed in 1750
Houses in Suffolk County, New York
National Register of Historic Places in Suffolk County, New York